All Saints' Church is an Anglican church, partly ruined, near the villages of Billockby and Fleggburgh, Norfolk, England. It is a Grade II listed building.

The porch and the chancel are in regular use. Services are held at 9am on the fourth Sunday of the month, from Easter to September.

History
The church dates from the 15th century. The roof of the nave collapsed in a storm on 15 July 1762; the nave and tower, of Perpendicular style, is in ruins. The nave is of knapped flint, and has large windows with remains of tracery.

The chancel is known to have been in use in 1762. It was restored in 1872 and is still in regular use. It is of flint with ashlar dressings, and has a thatched roof. The interior includes an octagonal 15th-century font.

References

Grade II listed churches in Norfolk
Church of England church buildings in Norfolk
Diocese of Norwich
Ruins in Norfolk
Church ruins in England
15th-century church buildings in England